The 1932 Iowa gubernatorial election was held on November 8, 1932. Democratic nominee Clyde L. Herring defeated incumbent Republican Dan W. Turner with 52.77% of the vote.

Primary elections
Primary elections were held on June 6, 1932.

Democratic primary

Candidates
Clyde L. Herring, businessman
Louis E. Roddewig
L. W. Housel, former Connecticut State Representative

Results

Republican primary

Candidates
Dan W. Turner, incumbent Governor
Otto Lange
J. W. Kime
Louis J. Kehoe

Results

General election

Candidates
Clyde L. Herring, Democratic 
Dan W. Turner, Republican

Results

References

1932
Iowa
Gubernatorial